The Gloaming is an Australian supernatural thriller streaming television series created by Victoria Madden that premiered on Stan on 1 January 2020. The series is set and filmed in Tasmania and stars Emma Booth and Ewen Leslie. On 9 May 2020, a second season was reported to be in development.

Premise
The Gloaming is the story of an unorthodox and troubled policewoman, Molly McGee, who leads an investigation into the murder of an unidentified woman. McGee has to team up with Alex O'Connell, a man she has not spoken to for 20 years. They discover that the murder has links to a cold case from the past, political corruption and occult practices.

Cast

Main
 Emma Booth as Molly McGee
 Ewen Leslie as Alex O'Connell
 Finn Ireland as Young Alex
 Aaron Pedersen as Inspector Lewis Grimshaw
 Anthony Phelan as William Fian
 Nicole Chamoun as Jacinta Clunes
 Ditch Davey as Toby Broomhall
 Max Brown  as Oscar Wolfe
 Josephine Blazier as Lily Broomhall
 Matthew Testro as Freddie Hopkins
 Markella Kavenagh as Daisy Hart
 Zenia Starr as Freya Harris
 Rena Owen as Grace Cochran
 Martin Henderson as Gareth McAvaney

Recurring
 Ben Morton as Constable Francis
 Milly Alcock as Jenny McGinty
 Airlie Dodds as Stephanie McGinty
 Nell Feeney as Shelly Hopkins
 Anni Finsterer as Eileen McGinty
 Katherine Pearson as Georgia
 Lisa Gormley as Angela Broomhall
 Dushan Philips as Eric Fox
 Virginie Laverdure as Maggie Madden
 Coco Whelan as Valerie Gowdie
 Kris McQuade as Carrie Bennett
 Ratidzo Mambo as Adrienne
 Nathan Spencer as Ben O'Connell

Episodes

Production
The Gloaming was created by Victoria Madden and produced by Madden and John Molloy, in partnership with Disney Platform Distribution, the distributor outside of Australia.

Release
In Australia, the series premiered on Stan on 1 January 2020.

In the United States the series debuted on Starz on 21 March 2021.

Notes

References

External links
 
 

2020 Australian television series debuts
2020s Australian drama television series
English-language television shows
Television shows set in Tasmania
Stan (service) original programming
Starz original programming